Izlaz And Isprat is a studio album by punk rock band Alien Father. It was released in 2006.

Track listing
"Alien Father"  – 1:36
"Gbacl Lravong"  – 2:50
"Your Life As A Kite"  – 1:42
"John Carnival"  – 2:01
"Jeffrey"  – 2:32
"Phobus"  – 2:58
"Lazerus"  – 1:20
"A Tate Production"  – 1:38
"Bend The Robot"  – 1:09
"Alex The Indian"  – 2:32
"The Hookter"  – 2:24
"Eshrag Me"  – 3:19
"Summer Samurai"  – 1:05

Album personnel
Dave Hallinger – guitar and vocals
Curtis Regian – bass guitar and synth
Mike Topley – drums

External links 
 Sons of Brothas

2007 albums
Alien Father albums